Trevon Wesco (born September 12, 1995) is an American football tight end of the National Football League (NFL). He played college football at Lackawanna College and West Virginia, and was drafted by the Jets in the fourth round of the 2019 NFL Draft.

Professional career

New York Jets 
Wesco was drafted by the New York Jets in the fourth round with the 121st overall pick in the 2019 NFL Draft. Throughout his rookie year, Wesco was largely used as a fullback, though he would occasionally play as a tight end. 

On November 9, 2020, Wesco was placed on injured reserve. He was activated on December 12, 2020.

Wesco entered the 2021 season as the third-string tight end behind Ryan Griffin and Tyler Kroft. He suffered a knee injury in Week 16 and was placed on injured reserve on December 27. He finished the season with three catches for 35 and no touchdowns through 12 games and seven starts. He was released by the Jets on August 30, 2022, as a part of roster cuts.

Chicago Bears 
On August 31, 2022, Wesco was claimed off waivers by the Chicago Bears.

References

External links
New York Jets bio
West Virginia Mountaineers bio

1995 births
Living people
American football tight ends
New York Jets players
Sportspeople from Martinsburg, West Virginia
Players of American football from West Virginia
West Virginia Mountaineers football players
Chicago Bears players